Charles Watkins (died 1808) was a Welsh lawyer and legal writer.

Life
His father was the Rev. William Watkins of Llanvetherine, near Abergavenny, Monmouthshire. He practised from 1799 as a certificated conveyancer, until his death on 15 February 1808.

Works
Watkins was author of:

 An Enquiry into the Title and Powers of His Majesty as Guardian of the Duchy of Cornwall during the late Minority of its Duke, n.d.
 An Essay towards the further Elucidation of the Law of Descents, 1793; 3rd edit. by Robert Studley Vidal, 1819; 4th edit. by Joshua Williams, 1837.
 Reflections on Government in general, with their Application to the British Constitution, 1796.
 Introduction (on the feudal system) to the fourth edition of Sir Geoffrey Gilbert's Law of Tenures, 1796.
 A Treatise on Copyholds, 1797–1799, 2 vols.; 3rd edit. by Vidal, 1821, 2 vols.; 4th edit. by Coventry, 1825. 
 An Enquiry into the Question, whether the Brother of the Paternal Grandmother shall succeed to the Inheritance of the Son in preference to the Brother of the Paternal Great-grandmother, 1798.
 Principles of Conveyancing, designed for the Use of Students, 1800; 9th edit. by Henry Hopley White, 1845.

Notes

Attribution

Year of birth missing
1808 deaths
Welsh lawyers
Welsh legal writers
People from Monmouthshire
18th-century Welsh lawyers